Samantha Keene Anderson (born December 12, 1997) is an American beauty pageant titleholder from Chandler, Arizona, who was crowned Miss United States 2021. She previously held the title of Miss Teen Arizona.

Anderson was orphaned in 2014 when both of her parents were killed in a plane crash in Telluride, Colorado. After her parents' death, Anderson became an advocate for diversity in aviation. Anderson's mother, Sherry, was one of the first female pilots to fly for a commercial airline.

References 

Living people
1997 births
American beauty pageant winners
People from Chandler, Arizona
Virginia Tech alumni